This is a list of notable co-operative enterprises by country. Co-operatives are business organizations owned and operated by a group of individuals for their mutual benefit.
For a list of Co-operative Federations, please see List of co-operative federations.

Africa

Kenya 
 Mwalimu Cooperative Savings & Credit Society Limited, the largest savings and credit cooperative society (Sacco), in Kenya
 Unaitas Sacco Society Limited, established 1993
 United Nations Cooperative Savings & Credit Society Limited (UN Sacco Ltd)

Uganda 
 Wazalendo Savings and Credit Cooperative Society (WASACCO)

Asia

India
Amul
Indian Farmers Fertiliser Cooperative (IFFCO)
Southern Green Farming And Marketing Multi State cooperative society ( Farmfed)

Japan 
 Co-op Kobe, officially known as Consumer Co-operative Kobe, is a Kobe, Japan-based consumers' cooperative. It is the largest retail cooperative in Japan and, with over 1.2 million members, is one of the largest cooperatives in the world.

Philippines 
 Lighthouse Cooperative, a multi-purpose cooperative in Tuguegarao City, Cagayan, Philippines established in 1998.
 Tagum Cooperative- a cooperative from Tagum City with 9 Branches and 1 Business Center in Region XI

Europe

Denmark 
 Coop amba, is a consumer co-operative based in Denmark. Coop amba also includes Coop Bank and Coop Invest, two financial subsidiaries.

Finland 
Metsäliitto
OP-Pohjola Group
S-Group
Valio

France 
 Crédit Agricole
 Enercoop is a French electricity supplier. It is the only one in France in the form of a cooperative.

Germany 

 The Edeka Group, the largest German supermarket corporation, consists of several co-operatives of independent supermarkets operating under the umbrella organisation Edeka Zentrale AG & Co KG, with headquarters in Hamburg.

Italy 

 Coop, a system of Italian consumers' cooperatives which operates the largest supermarket chain in Italy. Its headquarters are located in Casalecchio di Reno, Province of Bologna.

Ireland 
 Dublin Food Co-op is a vegetarian food co-operative located in The Liberties area of Dublin, Ireland, which deals primarily in organic wholefood produce.
Dairygold Co-Operative Society Limited is an Irish dairy co-operative based in Mitchelstown, County Cork, Ireland. It is Ireland's second largest dairy co-operative.
Ornua from the Irish "Ór Nua" meaning "new gold" (known as The Irish Dairy Board from 1961 to 2015) is an Irish Statutory agricultural cooperative, which markets and sells dairy products on behalf of its members: Irish dairy processors and Irish dairy farmers. The co-operative is Ireland’s largest exporter of Irish dairy products.

Poland 
 Społem is a Polish consumers' co-operative of local grocery stores founded in 1868.

Scandinavia 
 Arla Foods is a Swedish-Danish cooperative based in Aarhus, Denmark, and the largest producer of dairy products in Scandinavia.
Coop Norden (Coop Nordic) was a joint Scandinavian purchasing company that in 2007 dissolved and devolved to the constituent national cooperatives.

Spain 

Mondragón Cooperative Corporation is a federation of worker cooperatives based in the Basque region of Spain
Eroski, a Spanish supermarket chain with nearly 1,000 outlets spread across Spain, within the Mondragón Corporation group.

Switzerland 
Migros
Coop (Switzerland)
Raiffeisen Bank Switzerland

United Kingdom, Channel Islands and Isle of Man 

 Baywind Energy Co-operative
 Brighton Energy Co-operative
 Co-operative Press
 Daily Bread Co-operative
 Edinburgh Bicycle Co-operative
 Edinburgh Student Housing Co-operative
 Highburton Co-operative Society
 Ilkeston Co-operative Society
 Ipswich Industrial Co-operative Society formed 1868 now merged
 John Lewis Partnership (employee-owned business, not formal co-op)
 London Capital Credit Union
 New Internationalist
 The New Leaf Cooperative
 People's Press Printing Society
 The Phone Co-op
 Plymouth and South West Co-operative Society
 Revolver Co-operative
 Ruskin House
 Shared Interest
 Suma Wholefoods (Triangle Wholefoods Collective Ltd)
 Swann Morton worker co-op

 The Co-operative Group has 22 independent consumer co-operatives as corporate members or customer owners, including:
 Central England Co-operative
 Channel Islands Co-operative Society	
 Chelmsford Star Co-operative Society
 East of England Co-operative Society
 Heart of England Co-operative Society
 Lincolnshire Co-operative	
 The Midcounties Co-operative	
 Penrith Co-operative Society
 Radstock Co-operative Society		
 Scottish Midland Co-operative Society				
 Southern Co-operative
 
 Unicorn Grocery
 Veggies of Nottingham
 Westmill Solar Co-operative
 Westmill Wind Farm Co-operative

Football and rugby union supporters' trusts are incorporated as co-operatives of supporters. Several own the football club outright and many hold equity in the club.

North America 
Los Horcones, a Mexican producer cooperative and Walden Two (an experimental community)

Canada 

 Arctic Co-operatives Limited (retail co-operative in the Nunavut, Northwest Territories, Northern Manitoba.
 Blocks Recording Club (record label)
 Co-operatives and Mutuals Canada (CMC) is the national cooperative federation for Canadian co-operatives and mutuals headquartered in Ottawa, Ontario.
Canadian Press (newswire)
 Canadian University Press (newswire for student newspapers)
 The Co-operators, founded in 1945, is a Canadian insurance co-operative owned by 43 members.
 Farmers of North America, Farmers buying co-operative.
 Federated Co-operatives Limited (FCL), is a co-operative federation, established in 1955, providing procurement and distribution to member co-operatives in Western Canada.
 Home Hardware is a privately held Canadian home improvement, construction materials, and furniture retailer. Co-founded in 1964 by Walter Hachborn and headquartered in St. Jacobs, Ontario, the chain is cooperatively owned by over 1000 independently owned member stores.
 Stocksy United (Stocksy) is a Canadian multi-stakeholder platform cooperative, selling stock photos and videos on behalf of its international membership of 1500+ artist contributors.

Alberta 
 Alberta Wheat Pool
 Calgary Co-op (retail co-op)
 United Farmers of Alberta (UFA) is an agricultural supply cooperative headquartered in Calgary, Alberta, Canada, with over 120,000 members and with 2007 revenues of over $1.8 billion, UFA is ranked as the 37th largest business in Alberta by revenue according to Alberta Venture magazine.

British Columbia 
 Aaron Webster Housing Cooperative (formerly Cityview Co-op) is a housing cooperative located in Vancouver, British Columbia, Canada.
 CJLY-FM, radio station in Nelson, British Columbia.
 CFRO-FM, licensed and owned by Vancouver Co-operative Radio, is a non-commercial community radio station in Vancouver, British Columbia, in Coast Salish territory.
 Otter Co-op is a consumers' cooperative in Aldergrove, British Columbia, Canada.
 First West Credit Union
 VanCity Credit Union

New Brunswick 
 Co-op Atlantic (Moncton)

Ontario 
 Canadian University Press is a non-profit co-operative and newswire service owned by almost 90 student newspapers at post-secondary schools in Canada.
 Gay Lea Foods Co-operative Limited is a dairy products company in Canada producing butter, sour cream, cottage cheese, whipped cream and lactose free milk for retail, foodservice, industrial and export markets.
 Ontario Co-operative Association or On Co-op is a co-operative association serving co-operatives and co-op member organizations in Ontario, Canada.
 Organic Meadow Cooperative is an agricultural cooperative in Ontario. The cooperative originated in 1989 after local farmers sitting around a kitchen table realized that commercialized farming practices were not sustainable for them.
 Rochdale College, Toronto (defunct)
 St-Albert Cheese Co-operative
 Toronto Renewable Energy Co-operative
 Wireless Nomad was a non-profit cooperative based in Toronto, Ontario, Canada providing subscriber-owned home and business internet along with free Wi-Fi wireless Internet access the 70+ nodes, making it one of the largest free Wi-Fi networks in the country at the time.

Quebec 
 Agropur is a Canadian Agricultural cooperative headquartered in Longueuil, Quebec, Canada.
 Desjardins Group

Saskatchewan 
 CCRL Refinery Complex is an oil refinery spread over  located in the city of Regina, Saskatchewan, Canada owned by Consumers' Co-operative Refineries Limited (CCRL) that is in turn owned by Federated Co-operatives Limited (FCL).
 CFCR-FM – Community Radio Station (Saskatoon)
 Innovation Credit Union
 Saskatoon Co-op (Saskatoon)
 Saskatoon Farmers' Market (Saskatoon)
 Sherwood Co-op (Regina)
 Southern Rails Cooperative (railway)

United States 

 21st Street Co-op, student housing co-operative in Austin, Texas
 Ace Hardware, Oak Brook, Illinois
 Affiliated Foods Inc.
 Affiliated Foods Midwest Co-op Inc.
 Affiliated Foods Southwest
 AgFirst Farm Credit Bank
 AgriBank
 Ant Hill Cooperative
 Arizmendi Bakery, San Francisco, California
 Associated Food Stores
 Associated Grocers of Florida, Inc
 Associated Grocers of the South, Inc.
 Associated Grocers, Inc.
 Associated Press
 Associated Wholesale Grocers
 Associated Wholesalers, Inc.
 Audubon Mutual Housing Corporation
 Basin Electric Power Cooperative
 Berkeley Student Cooperative
 Black Star Co-op A brewpub located in Austin, TX
 Blue Diamond Growers
 Bob's Red Mill
 Brown Association for Cooperative Housing
 Cabot Creamery, Vermont-based dairy marketing
 CCA Global Partners
 Central Grocers Cooperative
 Certified Grocers Midwest
 Choptank Electric Cooperative
 CHS Inc.
 Coastal Federal Credit Union
 CoBank
 Co-operative Central Exchange
 Cooperative Development Foundation
 Dairy Farmers of America
 Dairylea Cooperative Inc.
 Delta and Providence Cooperative Farms
 Diamond Walnut Growers, Inc.
 Do It Best
 Equal Exchange
 Farm Credit Bank of Texas
 First Tech Credit Union
 Florida's Natural Growers (formerly Citrus World Inc.)
 Florists' Transworld Delivery (FTD)
 Fourth Estate
 Freedom Farm Cooperative, an agricultural cooperative founded by American civil rights activist Fannie Lou Hamer in 1967
 Full Sail Brewing Company
 George Street Co-op
 Great River Energy
 Greenbelt Homes, Inc.
 Greenbelt News Review
 Group Health Cooperative
 GROWMARK, Inc.
 Harvard/MIT Cooperative Society
 Inter-Cooperative Council at the University of Michigan (Ann Arbor MI)
 Land O'Lakes
 Madison Community Co-op
 MFA Incorporated
 Michigan State University Student Housing Cooperative
 National Cooperative Bank (now NCB)
 National Cooperative Business Association (NCBA)
 National Co+op Grocers (NCG)
 National Grape Cooperative Association, Inc.
 National Rural Utilities Cooperative Finance Corporation
 Navy Federal Credit Union
 New Deal Cafe
 New Mexico Educators Federal Credit Union
 Nebraska Rural Radio Association
 Northcountry Cooperative Development Fund
 Oberlin Student Cooperative Association
 Ocean Spray (cooperative)
 Oglethorpe Power Corporation
 Old Dominion Electric Cooperative
 Park Slope Food Coop
 Pentagon Federal Credit Union
 People's Food Co-op (Portland)
 Piggly Wiggly Alabama
 Pioneer Telephone Cooperative (Oklahoma)
 Pioneer Telephone Cooperative (Oregon)
 Princeton Cooperative
 R.E.I. (Recreational Equipment Inc.)
 Rapidan Camps
 Riceland Foods
 Scary Cow Productions
 Snake River Sugar Company
 Southern Maryland Electric Cooperative
 Southern States Cooperative
 Sunkist Growers, Inc.
 Tennessee Farmers Cooperative
 The Union Credit Union
 Tillamook County Creamery Association
 Topco Associates
 True Value Corporation
 U.S. AgBank, FCB
 U.S. Central Credit Union
 Unified Western Grocers
 USA Federal Credit Union (San Diego, Ca)
 United Hardware Distributing Company (Hardware Hank)
 Universal Cooperatives
 URM Stores
 VHA, Inc.
 Wakefern Food Corporation
 Weaver's Way Co-op
 Weaver Street Market
 Wedge Community Co-op
 Welch's (Welch Foods Inc.)
 Western Family Holding Company
 Western Sugar Cooperative
 WestFarm Foods
 Wheatsville Co-op
 Whole Foods Co-op
 Winfield Park Mutual Housing Corporation
 WSIPC

Oceania

Australia 
 Dairy Farmers is one of the largest and oldest dairy manufacturers in Australia, established in 1900, supplying products to local and international markets such as Eastern Europe, the Middle East and Asia. Kirin Holdings Company, Limited of Japan, via its subsidiary National Foods, acquired the company on 27 November 2008. The Co-op later being listed up for sale in 2019 and later sold on January 25, 2021 to the wholly owned Australian company Bega Cheese.
CBH Group and Wesfarmers both started as co-operative groups in Western Australia in the early twentieth century.

New Zealand 

 Electricity Ashburton
 Farmers' Mutual Group
 Fonterra Co-operative Group 
 Foodstuffs (Auckland) Cooperative
 Foodstuffs South Island Cooperative
 Foodstuffs (Wellington) Cooperative
 Mitre 10
 Nelson Building Society
 Paper Plus Group
 Silver Fern Farms
 SBS Bank
 Southern Cross Medical Care Society
 Tatua Cooperative Dairy Company
 The Co-operative Bank
 Westland Cooperative Dairy Company

See also 

 List of co-operative federations
 List of employee-owned companies
 List of energy cooperatives
 List of food cooperatives
 List of retailers' cooperatives
 List of worker cooperatives
 List of utility cooperatives

Notes

Cooperatives by country
Lists of cooperatives